The 2007 1. divisjon season (referred to as Adeccoligaen for sponsorship reasons) was a Norwegian second-tier football season. The season began on April 9, 2007 and concluded on November 4, 2007. It was the tenth and final season in which teams competed for two automatic promotion spots and one playoff spot.

The 1. divisjon was won by Molde, who finished one point ahead of Ham-Kam. Both clubs were relegated from the Tippeligaen in 2006 and were promoted back to the highest level after only one season. Bodø/Glimt finished third and defeated Odd Grenland in the playoff to earn promotion.

Of the four teams promoted from the 2. divisjon in 2006, only Notodden managed to hold on to their spot. They played in the 1. divisjon for the first time in their history, finishing in ninth place (Snøgg and Heddal, the club's predecessors, have both played in the second tier, last in 1967 and 1961 respectively).

Raufoss returned to the 1. divisjon after being relegated in 2004 and were able to finish in eleventh place. However, due to financial problems and failure to meet demands on infrastructure, the Football Association of Norway decided not to award Raufoss the required license for play in the top two divisions. Raufoss were demoted to the 2. divisjon and their place given to Sparta Sarpsborg, who finished in thirteenth place.

Mandalskameratene and Skeid were relegated to the 2. divisjon after one season. They were joined by Tromsdalen, who survived for two seasons.

League table

Results

Top goalscorers

Relegated teams
These two teams were relegated from the Tippeligaen in 2006:
Ham-Kam
Molde

Promoted teams
These four teams were promoted from the 2. divisjon at the start of the season:
Mandalskameratene
Notodden
Raufoss
Skeid

See also
2007 Tippeligaen
2007 2. divisjon
2007 3. divisjon

References

External links
1. divisjon 2007 on NRK Sport: Fixtures and results - Top scorers, Yellow cards, Red cards - Final standings

Norwegian First Division seasons
2
Norway
Norway